The 1994–95  Liga Leumit season began on 27 August 1994 and ended on 27 May 1995, with Maccabi Tel Aviv winning the title.

That season had two rounds, each team played the other teams twice. The two teams that were relegated to Liga Artzit were: Maccabi Netanya and Maccabi Ironi Ashdod.

Three team from Liga Artzit were promoted at the end of the previous season: Hapoel Beit She'an, Hapoel Ironi Rishon LeZion and Beitar Tel Aviv. The team relegated was: Hapoel Kfar Saba.

Final table

Results

Top scorers

References
Israel - List of Final Tables RSSSF

Liga Leumit seasons
Israel
1994–95 in Israeli football leagues